Hosoya's triangle or the Hosoya triangle (originally Fibonacci triangle) is a triangular arrangement of numbers (like Pascal's triangle) based on the Fibonacci numbers. Each number is the sum of the two numbers above in either the left diagonal or the right diagonal.

Name
The name "Fibonacci triangle" has also been used for triangles composed of Fibonacci numbers or related numbers or triangles with Fibonacci sides and integral area, hence is ambiguous.

Recurrence
The numbers in this triangle obey the recurrence relations

and

Relation to Fibonacci numbers
The entries in the triangle satisfy the identity

Thus, the two outermost diagonals are the Fibonacci numbers, while the numbers on the middle vertical line are the squares of the Fibonacci numbers. All the other numbers in the triangle are the product of two distinct Fibonacci numbers greater than 1. The row sums are the first convolved Fibonacci numbers.

References

Triangles of numbers
Fibonacci numbers